The following is a list of armed conflicts with victims in 2015.

The Heidelberg Institute for International Conflict Research estimated that there were 223 politically-motivated armed conflicts (of which 43 estimated as highly violent: 19 full-scale wars, 24 limited wars) worldwide during 2015.

List guidelines 
This list is an archive of armed conflicts having done globally at least 100 victims and at least 1 victim during the year 2015.

10,000+ deaths in 2015

1,000–9,999 deaths in 2015

100–999 deaths in 2015

Fewer than 100 deaths in 2015

See also

References
Notes

Citations

External links
Major Episodes of Political Violence 1946–2014 – List of armed conflicts compiled by Dr. Monty G. Marshall, director of the Center for Systemic Peace, based on research sponsored by the Political Instability Task Force.
UCDP Conflict Encyclopedia  – Uppsala Conflict Data Program of the Department of Peace and Conflict Research at Uppsala University.
Armed Conflicts Report Interactive Map, by Project Ploughshares.
Global Conflict Tracker, by the Council on Foreign Relations.
CrisisWatch – Monthly bulletin, interactive map and database on ongoing conflicts by the International Crisis Group.
Map of the world's conflicts, by IRIN.
Modern Conflicts Database – 2007 Database of all post-Cold War conflicts with estimated death tolls of 25,000 or more, by the Political Economy Research Institute of the University of Massachusetts Amherst.
Global Security coverage of ongoing wars
Wars in the world
History Guy's coverage of 21st century wars
Heidelberg Institute for International Conflict Research (HIIK)
Conflict Barometer – Describes recent trends in conflict development, escalations, and settlements
Insight on Conflict – Database on peace-building initiatives in areas of conflict

2015
 
2015